The Simon Attias Synagogue is a nineteenth-century synagogue in Essaouira, Morocco, formerly known as Mogador, Morocco. The synagogue was built in 1882.  

The synagogue forms one wing of a masonry, courtyard building that also contained the home of Simon Attias. A single, large door set into a Horseshoe arch leads into the suite of buildings. The synagogue is on the second floor.  The ground floor once held shops.  The third floor contained the offices of Jewish courts, which heard both commercial and personal cases. The synagogue proper is a space two stories high, with large, rounded-arch windows and a women's gallery.

The interior woodword was carved in London. The large, wooden Torah Ark featured columns and a rounded pediment, and is decorated with floral carvings.  A large number of memorial lambs survived in 1993, including one to the memory of Simon Attias, who died in 1892.  In 1993 the synagogue was in sound condition.  In 2009 it is closed and is now undergoing restoration and conversion to a museum.

After the restoration, the synagogue is now part of the museum Bayt Dakira.

References

Synagogues in Morocco
Essaouira
Synagogues completed in 1882
Synagogues preserved as museums
19th-century architecture in Morocco